The 1938 U.S. Open was the 42nd U.S. Open, held June 9–11 at Cherry Hills Country Club in Englewood, Colorado, a suburb south of Denver. Defending champion Ralph Guldahl won his second straight U.S. Open title, six strokes ahead of runner-up Dick Metz. It was the second of Guldahl's three major titles.

Metz owned a four-stroke lead over Guldahl after Saturday morning's third round, but Metz struggled in the afternoon and shot a 79 (+8) to finish at 290 (+6). Guldahl began his round with two birdies in his first six holes on his way to a 69 (−2) and an even-par 284 total, six strokes ahead of Metz. His six-shot victory was the largest since Jim Barnes won by nine strokes in 1921. Guldahl became the fourth player to successfully defend at the U.S. Open, joining Willie Anderson, John McDermott, and Bobby Jones. There have only been three since: Ben Hogan in 1951, Curtis Strange in 1989 and Brooks Koepka in 2018.

In the second round, Ray Ainsley set a dubious record by shooting a 19 on the par-4 16th hole. Ainsley's ball landed in a creek, and instead of taking a drop he continued to play the ball out. He shot 96 (+25) for the round and missed the cut.

This was the first U.S. Open played in the western United States. The U.S. Open returned in 1960 and 1978, and the PGA Championship was played here in 1941 and 1985.

This was the first U.S. Open in which the players were limited to a maximum of 14 clubs; the USGA rule (4-4) went into effect in January 1938. Guldahl won the title the previous year with 19 clubs in his bag.

Past champions in the field

Made the cut 

Source:

Missed the cut 

Source:

Round summaries

First round
Thursday, June 9, 1938

Source:

Second round
Friday, June 10, 1938

Source:

Third round
Saturday, June 11, 1938 (morning)

Source:

Final round
Saturday, June 11, 1938 (afternoon)

Source:

References

External links
USGA Championship Database

U.S. Open (golf)
Golf in Colorado
Englewood, Colorado
Sports competitions in Denver
U.S. Open
U.S. Open
U.S. Open
U.S. Open
1930s in Denver